Bożena Dykiel (born 26 August 1948) is a Polish theater and film actress.

References

External links

1948 births
Polish actresses
Living people
Polish stage actresses
Polish film actresses
Polish television actresses
20th-century Polish actresses
Recipients of the Bronze Cross of Merit (Poland)
Aleksander Zelwerowicz National Academy of Dramatic Art in Warsaw alumni